The 1954 Rhode Island gubernatorial election was held on November 2, 1954. Incumbent Democrat Dennis J. Roberts defeated Republican nominee Dean J. Lewis with 57.69% of the vote.

General election

Candidates
Major party candidates
Dennis J. Roberts, Democratic 
Dean J. Lewis, Republican

Other candidates
Arthur E. Marley, Independent

Results

References

1954
Rhode Island
Gubernatorial